Vascular corrosion casting uses resin to capture the 3D structure of blood vessels within human and animal tissue. It is widely used in research as a technique for obtaining the volume and surface area of the blood vessel network within an organ. The earliest known use of corrosion casting was by Robert Boyle in 1663.

Technique
Vascular corrosion casting requires the use of a solidifying material such as a resin. The most common resin used for vascular corrosion casting is Batson's 17. The process begins with the draining of blood from vessels to prevent blockage from clotting, this can be achieved by perfusing blood vessels with a physiological fluid such as phosphate buffered saline. Subsequently, the blood vessels of interest are filled with resin (or alternative solidifying material). The resin is allowed to cure resulting in the blood vessel network containing a solid plastic material. Surrounding tissue is dissolved away using a corrosive chemical, commonly potassium hydroxide. Corrosion should not affect the resin, only dissolving tissue. The final product is a 3D network of blood vessels.

External links
Corrosion cast of blood vessels in the brain - Wellcome Collection

References

Angiology